Tonsillar branch may refer to:
 tonsillar branch of the facial artery
 tonsillar branch of posterior inferior cerebellar artery
 tonsillar branch of the glossopharyngeal nerve
 tonsillar branch of the lesser palatine nerves